Tarantella is a 1995 drama film directed by Helen De Michiel, starring Mira Sorvino as the main character. The film premiered on June 7, 1995, at the Seattle International Film Festival and was released theatrically in the United States on March 15, 1996.

Plot
Diane Di Sorella, a young Italian American professional photographer, has to return suddenly to New Jersey, where she grew up, when her mother dies to settle her estate. In recent years Diane didn't get on with her, and begins to remember her embittered mother whom she abandoned. But at the same time, she begins to rediscover the heritage she rejected a long time ago when she is amongst her neighbours while packing up the house. Then she meets a close friend of her grandmother's and late mother's, who gives her support in this tough time and also gives Diane her mother's last gift: a secret journal kept by her mother. As it is written in Italian the woman must read it to Diane. This helps her learn more about her mother's history, and as she does so she finally comes to terms with the relationship they had and her own Italian heritage.

Cast
 Mira Sorvino as Diane
 Rose Gregorio as Pina
 Matthew Lillard as Matt
 Frank Pellegrino as Lou
 Stephen Spinella as Frank
 Maryann Urbano as Mother
 Antonia Rey as Grandmother
 Melissa Maxwell as Young Diana
 Magda Lang as Home Buyer Woman
 Sean Baldwin as Home Buyer Man
 Derek Vontreras as Home Buyer Young Man
 A.J. Lopez as Home Buyer Young Man
 Gaetano Lisco as Father
 Carol Dante as Tarantella Dancer
 Andrew M. Fuchs as Tarentella Trio

See also
 Tarantella

References

External links
 
 

1995 films
American drama films
Films about Italian-American culture
1990s English-language films
1990s American films